Port Antonio is the capital of the parish of Portland on the northeastern coast of Jamaica, about  from Kingston. It had a population of 12,285 in 1982 and 13,246 in 1991. It is the island's third largest port, famous as a shipping point for bananas and coconuts, as well as one of its most important tourist attractions, tourism being a major contributor to the town’s economy.

History

Port Antonio was a settlement first established in Spanish Jamaica, when it was known as Puerto Anton.

Portland formally became a parish in 1723 by order of the Duke of Portland, the then-Governor of Jamaica after whom it is named. The existing port was to be called Port Antonio and was slated to become a naval stronghold. To that end, by 1729, the colonial government began to build Fort George on the peninsula separating the twin East and West harbors known as the Titchfield promontory. The fort was intended to protect settlers from attacks by the Spanish from the sea, and from the Jamaican Maroons who lived in the mountains.

Port Antonio was a sleepy coastal town until the 1880s, when Lorenzo Dow Baker started the banana trade in Jamaica and successfully promoted Port Antonio as a destination for wealthy American travelers. "Portie" became a boom town. The banana trade and the tourists who came in the banana boats, was once so large that at one time, weekly sailing from Port Antonio was greater than weekly sailing from the great English port of Liverpool.

The island was glamorized by Hollywood as a model of paradise in movies of the 1940s and 1950s, and in later movies such as Club Paradise and Cocktail. This image was added to by the arrival of movie star Errol Flynn in 1946 when his yacht, the Zaca washed ashore in bad weather. He subsequently bought nearby Navy Island, part of historic Fort George in Port Antonio as well as hundreds of acres of farmland along the Portland coast.

Climate
Port Antonio features a trade-wind tropical rainforest climate under the Köppen climate classification. Like many areas with this climate type, average temperatures vary little throughout the course of the year, with average monthly temperatures roughly at  throughout the year. The town has a noticeably drier period from February through April, however it has no true dry season month as all 12 months on average easily exceeds  of precipitation. Port Antonio averages a copious  of rainfall annually.

Tourist destinations

Other sights include the secluded Frenchman's Cove Beach, the ruins of Folly Mansion and the historic DeMontevin Lodge. The Rio Grande, Boston Bay and Reach Falls are nearby. In addition there is the Bay View Eco Resort located on a former coconut plantation and Pimento Lodge in Long Bay.

Transport

Bus
Port Antonio is a hub for bus transport in the north east of the island.

Rail
Port Antonio was the terminus of the now abandoned railway from Kingston via Spanish Town and Bog Walk, which was primarily built to serve the banana export trade.

In popular culture
The 1963 drama film Lord of the Flies and the 1990 remake of the same name were both filmed at Frenchman's Cove.

The 1986 comedy film Club Paradise starring Robin Williams was filmed on location mostly in and around Port Antonio as the fictitious island of St Nicholas. Local sites such as the town's courthouse, the tax office (which in the film served as the police station), Blue Lagoon, Frenchman's Cove, Winifred Beach, were used as the backdrop to the story.  

The 1988 romantic comedy drama film Cocktail starring Tom Cruise was partially shot in Port Antonio, also with scenes of Frenchman's Cove and Blue Lagoon. 

The 1988 drama film Clara's Heart starring Whoopi Goldberg has scenes filmed in Port Antonio.
 
The 1989 thriller film The Mighty Quinn was filmed at various locations throughout Jamaica, with the principal outdoor scenes shot in Port Antonio.

The official music video for the 1995 hit single "Fu-Gee-La" by the hip-hop trio Fugees was filmed in and around Port Antonio. Notable scenes include Folly Ruins (also the backdrop for a scene in The Mighty Quinn) and the town's Cenotaph Square. 

The 2010 action comedy film Knight and Day starring Tom Cruise has scenes filmed at Frenchman's Cove.

The 2021 spy film No Time to Die starring Daniel Craig as James Bond, was partially filmed in and around Port Antonio.

Notable residents

References

External links

 Guide to attractions and sights in Port Antonio
 A History of Portland

Populated places in Portland Parish
1723 establishments in the British Empire